Lesjaverk Station is a railway station at Lesja in Dovre, Norway on the Rauma Line. The station was opened as part of the first stretch of the railway in 1921.

Railway stations in Oppland
Railway stations on the Rauma Line
Railway stations opened in 1921
Dovre